The Shag Harbour UFO incident was the reported impact of an unknown large object into waters near Shag Harbour, Nova Scotia, a tiny fishing village on the Atlantic coast, on 4 October 1967. The reports were investigated by various Canadian civilian (RCMP and Canadian Coast Guard) and military (Canadian Forces navy and air force) agencies as well as the U.S. Condon Committee.

Pre-incident aerial phenomenon

Air Canada flight 305
In his report, the captain reported an object tracking along on a parallel course a few miles away. He describes it as a brilliantly lit, rectangular object with a string of smaller lights trailing it. At 7:19 pm, the pilots noticed a sizeable silent explosion near the large object. Two minutes later, a second explosion occurred which faded to a blue cloud around the object.

Yellow object
Darrel Dorey, his sister Annette, and his mother were sitting on their front porch in Mahone Bay, when they noticed a large object manoeuvring above the southwestern horizon. The next day he wrote a letter to RCAF Greenwood Base Commander asking what was flying over the water that evening, as he had never seen anything like it.

MV Nickerson of Sambro, Nova Scotia
While standing at the wheelhouse of his vessel, Captain Leo Howard Mersey was looking at four blips on his Decca radar that were stationary. The entire crew of nearly twenty fishermen stood on deck and watched the object in the northeastern sky. Mersey radioed the rescue coordination centre and the harbour master in Halifax asking for an explanation and filed a report with the Lunenburg RCMP outlining his sighting when they returned to port.

Halifax Harbour sightings
The Chronicle-Herald and local radio stations reported a glowing object that was seen by many people who called their newsroom. They reported witnessing strange glowing objects flying around Halifax at around 10:00 pm.

Initial events

On the night of 4 October 1967, at about 11:20 pm Atlantic Daylight Time, it was reported that something had crashed into the waters of Shag Harbour. At least eleven people saw a low-flying lit object head towards the harbour. Multiple witnesses reported hearing a whistling sound "like a bomb," then a "whoosh," and finally a loud bang. The object was never officially identified, and was therefore referred to as an unidentified flying object (UFO) in Government of Canada documents. The Canadian military became involved in a subsequent rescue/recovery effort. The initial report was made by local resident Laurie Wickens and four of his friends. Driving through Shag Harbour, on Highway 3, they spotted a large object descending into the waters off the harbour. Wickens contacted the RCMP detachment in Barrington Passage and reported he had seen a large airplane or small airliner crash into the waters off Shag Harbour.

Search and rescue efforts 

Assuming an aircraft had crashed, within about 15 minutes, two RCMP officers arrived at the scene. Concerned for survivors, the RCMP detachment contacted the Rescue Coordination Centre (RCC) in Halifax to advise them of the situation and ask if any aircraft were missing. Before any attempt at rescue could be made, the flying object, with lights still showing, started to sink and disappeared from view.

A rescue mission was quickly assembled. Within half an hour of the crash, local fishing boats went out to the crash site in the waters of the Gulf of Maine off Shag Harbour to look for survivors. No survivors, bodies or debris were taken, either by the fishermen or by a Canadian Coast Guard search and rescue cutter, which arrived about an hour later from nearby Clark's Harbour.

By the next morning, RCC Halifax had determined that no aircraft were missing. While still tasked with the search, the captain of the Canadian Coast Guard cutter received a radio message from RCC Halifax that all commercial, private and military aircraft were accounted for along the eastern seaboard, in both Atlantic provinces and New England.

The same morning, RCC Halifax also sent a priority telex to the "Air Desk" at air force headquarters in Ottawa, which handled all civilian and military UFO sightings, informing them of the crash and that all conventional explanations such as aircraft, flares, etc. had been dismissed.  Therefore, this was labelled a "UFO Report."  The head of the Air Desk then sent another priority telex to the navy headquarters concerning the "UFO Report" and recommended an underwater search be mounted.  The navy, in turn, sent another priority telex tasking Fleet Diving Unit Atlantic with carrying out the search.

Two days after the incident had been observed, a detachment of navy divers from Fleet Diving Unit Atlantic was assembled and for the next three days, they combed the seafloor of the Gulf of Maine off Shag Harbor looking for an object. The final report said no trace of an object was found.

Documents
There is a summary of the event from the Department of National Defence files located at the national Library and Archives.

Press coverage
The Shag Harbour reports received extensive front page coverage in the Halifax Chronicle-Herald.  The paper ran a headline story on 7 October titled, "Could Be Something Concrete in Shag Harbor UFO – RCAF."  The article, by Ray MacLeod, included witness descriptions of an alleged object and crash, the air force's search and rescue effort, and the navy's underwater search that was underway, including three additional divers from Fleet Diving Unit Atlantic.

The head of the air force's "Air Desk" in Ottawa, Squadron Leader Bain, who recommended the navy undertake an underwater search, was also quoted, saying the air force was "very interested" in the matter.  "We get hundreds of reports every week, but the Shag Harbor incident is one of the few where we may get something concrete on it.”

The article also mentioned UFO reports that immediately preceded the incident, including one from a woman in Halifax around 10:00 pm.

The Chronicle-Herald ran another story on 9 October titled "UFO Search Called Off," stating that the navy had ended "an intensive undersea search for the mysterious unidentified flying object that disappeared into the ocean here Wednesday night."  As to what was found, the navy stated, "Not a trace... not a clue... not a bit of anything." The story of the search being called off for an alleged "mysterious" "dark object" was also carried by The Canadian Press in other newspapers.

References

Further reading 
 Canada's Unidentified Flying Objects: The Search for the Unknown at Library and Archives Canada

External links 
 Detailed Canadian government topological maps of Shag Harbour region
 

Culture of Nova Scotia
Shelburne County, Nova Scotia
UFO sightings
UFO crashes
1967 in Nova Scotia